Norwegian State Council on Disability is a Norwegian government agency responsible for giving advice on matters within discrimination of people with disabilities, including issues related to public accessibility. The council has fourteen members, elected for four years, and acts as an advisory board, primarily related to other public agencies. It was created in 1991.

References

Disability, Norwegian State Council on
Government agencies established in 1991
1991 establishments in Norway
Disability organizations